Gagarinsky District is the name of several administrative and municipal districts in Russia.
Gagarinsky District, Moscow, a district in South-Western Administrative Okrug of the federal city of Moscow
Gagarinsky District, Smolensk Oblast, an administrative and municipal district of Smolensk Oblast
Gagarinsky District, Sevastopol, an administrative district of the federal city of Sevastopol (located on the Crimean Peninsula, which is disputed between Russia and Ukraine)

See also
Gagarinsky (disambiguation)
Gagarinskoye Municipal Okrug, a municipal okrug of Moskovsky District of Saint Petersburg, Russia

References